John Griffiths (born 16 June 1951) is an English former professional footballer who made 185 appearances in the Football League playing as a midfielder for Aston Villa and Stockport County. He also played non-league football for Kidderminster Harriers. Griffiths was born in 1951 in Oldbury, Worcestershire, and represented Oldbury & West Smethwick Schools before joining Aston Villa as an apprentice in 1966.

References

External links
 Stockport County statistics at HattersMatters

1951 births
Living people
People from Oldbury, West Midlands
English footballers
Association football midfielders
Aston Villa F.C. players
Stockport County F.C. players
Kidderminster Harriers F.C. players
English Football League players